Academic Chess is a non-profit program founded in 1994 that teaches elementary-aged students how to play chess. It produced many United States Chess Federation-ranked players, including Nicholas Nip, a 9- year- old who in 2008 became the youngest chess master in history at age 9. Other top chess players that are graduates of Academic Chess' instruction include former national scholastic champions Kyle Shin and Alex Costello, among others. Academic Chess has taught more than 100,000 children in California, Nevada and Utah.

History

Academic Chess was founded by Eric Hicks, a native of Hawthorne, California and a high school dropout who discovered a talent for chess while playing the game on Santa Monica Beach. He was ranked among the top 100 players for his age group. He attended  El Camino College, and later into the University of California, Berkeley. He holds a degree in English and was awarded with the Eisner Prize Award for fiction. But reading the Eisner awards there is no Eric Hicks ever having received and award. Citations offer no proof. nor is there any record of a graduate named Eric Hicks Hicks is also an electric bicycle enthusiast, contributing articles about the subject to websites, including Boing Boing. In addition, Hicks is founder and editor of the ebike site electricbike.com and founder of California-based ebike manufacturer LunaCycle.

During his time at the college, he taught chess to young children, he was an instructor at The Berkeley School of Chess and gave particular attention inner-city youths who were most at-risk. After graduating from Berkeley, Hicks took a job writing software manuals but in his spare time he went back to teaching chess at the Las Palmas Elementary School in San Clemente. Other schools expressed interest in Hicks’ chess program and the Las Palmas Elementary School's teachers and administration recommended his instructional methods. Hicks taught other schools in the district.

Hicks founded Academic Chess in 1994. It has taught over 500,000 students and was one of the first independent afterschool programs in California. It is in 200 California, Nevada and Utah schools during school hours and afterschool. The program operates a summer program, as well as "Friday Knight Tournaments".

Academic Chess teaches children in elementary school the basics of chess by giving the pieces backstories to explain their movements, with rhyming and music devices.

Students
One of the most famous members of Academic Chess was Nicholas Nip. In 2008, Nip broke the standing record at the time for the youngest US Chess Federation Master at 9 years and 11 months and was coached by Hicks and his wife, Lina Vark and was enrolled in Academic Chess programs from the time he was in kindergarten. Hicks saw Nip's potential when he was kindergarten and he defeated nine established masters before attaining the rank, progressing from Expert to Master in less than a year.

Other students Academic Chess helped to develop into USCF Masters include Kyle Shin and Alex Costello, among others.

Despite the success of developing nationally ranked talent, Hicks said he is primarily interested in bringing chess to schools of all kinds, public and private, and to students of all ability levels, capabilities and needs.

References

External links
Official website
Official Facebook page

Chess in the United States
Chess organizations